The Annecy Round was a multi-year multilateral trade negotiation (MTN) between 26 nation-states that were parties to the GATT. This second round took place in 1949 in Annecy, France. 34 countries took part in the round. The main focus of the talks was more tariff reductions, around 5,000 in total.

References

World Trade Organization
General Agreement on Tariffs and Trade
Commercial treaties
Treaties concluded in 1949